Rudžiai (formerly) is a village in Kėdainiai district municipality, in Kaunas County, in central Lithuania. According to the 2011 census, the village had a population of 61 people. There is a farm.

Formerly it was a property of the Babenskiai, Paulauskai and Macenisovai families.

Demography

References

Villages in Kaunas County
Kėdainiai District Municipality